Dwight Scharnhorst (born November 11, 1947) is an American politician. He was a member of the Missouri House of Representatives, having served 2006 to 2015. He is a member of the Republican party.

References

Living people
Republican Party members of the Missouri House of Representatives
1947 births